Mason Burnett (born August 30, 1983) is an American professional wrestler, best known for his time in Impact Wrestling where he competed under the ring name Kaleb with a K, or simply, Kaleb Konley. He is best known under the ring name Caleb Konley, and has performed under a mask as Suicide. He has also wrestled for the National Wrestling Alliance.

Professional wrestling career

Independent circuit (2005–2020)
On September 17, 2005 for Pro Wrestling Evolution, Konley made his debut under the ring name Black Pegasus.

In the fall of 2019 he began appearing on the National Wrestling Alliance's NWA Power YouTube series under the name Caleb Konley. On the March 3 edition of Power, Konley and his tag team partner C. W. Anderson defeated the Dawson's to win contracts with the NWA.

Total Nonstop Action Wrestling / Impact Wrestling (2016–2022) 
In April 2016, Konley made his Total Nonstop Action Wrestling (TNA) debut at Impact tapings, facing both Eddie Edwards and DJZ in losing efforts for Xplosion. On April 29, TNA officially announced Konley's signing to the company. Konley would make his last appearance as a contracted wrestler at One Night Only: X-Travaganza, where Konley once again faced off against Edwards in a losing effort. In March 2017, Burnett began working under a mask as the newest incarnation of the Suicide character.

On August 17, 2017, at Destination X: Impact, Konley would interfere on behalf of Trevor Lee in the X Division Championship match against Sonjay Dutt, forming an alliance and turning heel in the process. In the coming weeks, Konley would go on to change his attire to simple black trunks, mirroring Trevor Lee's look. On the October 5 episode of Impact!, Konley, Lee and Andrew Everett would face Sonjay Dutt, Petey Williams, and Matt Sydal in a losing effort in a six-man tag team match. On January 1, 2019, Trevor Lee left Impact Wrestling, disbanding the team. On January 26, 2019, his profile was moved to the alumni section. On March 1, 2019, Konley announced on his Twitter that he had officially become a free agent.

On the September 8, 2020, episode of Impact, Konley made his return to Impact under the name Kaleb with a K debuting a new gimmick of Tenille Dashwood's personal photographer. On April 14, 2022, Konley announced his departure from Impact Wrestling.

Personal life
Konley has been in a relationship with fellow professional wrestler Kris Statlander.

Championships and accomplishments
America's Most Liked Wrestling
AML Pretige Championship (1 time)
AML Wrestling Championship (1 time)
Deep South Wrestling
DSW Tag Team Championship (1 time) – with Sal Rinauro
Exodus Wrestling Alliance
EWA Junior Heavyweight Championship (1 time)
Full Impact Pro
FIP Tag Team Championship (1 time) – with Scott Reed
FIP World Heavyweight Championship (1 time)
Dragon Gate USA
Open the United Gate Championship (1 time) – with Anthony Nese and Trent Barreta
Six-Man Tag Team Tournament (2014) – with Anthony Nese and Trent Barreta
Paragon Pro Wrestling
PPW Heavyweight Championship (1 time)
PPW Tag Team Championship (1 time) – with Drew Donovan
Premiere Wrestling Xperience
PWX Heavyweight Championship (2 times)
PWX Tag Team Championships (1 time) - with Zane Riley
Pro Wrestling Illustrated
Ranked No. 259 of the best 500 singles wrestlers in the PWI 500 in 2016
Pro Wrestling International
PWI Ultra J Championship (2 times)
Pro Wrestling Revolver
PWR Open Invite Scramble Championship (1 time)
West Coast Wrestling Connection
WCWC Legacy Championship (1 time)
WCWC Pacific Northwest Championship (1 time)
WCWC Tag Team Championship (1 time) – with Mikey O'Shea
WrestleForce
WrestleForce Championship (1 time)

References

External links

1983 births
Living people
People from Cartersville, Georgia
American male professional wrestlers
Professional wrestlers from Georgia (U.S. state)
FIP World Heavyweight Champions